Bernadette O'Farrell (30 January 1924 – 26 September 1999) was an Irish actress. She was born in Birr, County Offaly, Irish Free State. She was married to the film writer, director and producer Frank Launder from 1950 until his death in 1997. They had two daughters together.

She is best known for playing Maid Marian in the 1950s TV version of The Adventures of Robin Hood. She left the show in 1957, after 78 episodes, to avoid type-casting, and was replaced by Patricia Driscoll.

She played an English mistress, Miss Harper, in The Happiest Days of Your Life (1949), Jessie Bond in The Story of Gilbert and Sullivan (1953) and Peg Curtis in the boxing film The Square Ring (1953). She retired from acting in 1959 to live on a farm in Buckinghamshire, England. Later, O'Farrell and Launder moved to Monaco.  Her last film appearance was in The Wildcats of St. Trinian's (1980).

Filmography

References

External links 
 

1924 births
1999 deaths
20th-century Irish actresses
Irish expatriates in Monaco
Irish film actresses